Birotto  is a 2022 Bangladeshi Drama and Thriller film written and  directed by Saidul Islam Rana and produced by Ping-Pong Entertainment.The film features Emon, Nipun, Salwa, Intekhab Dinar in lead role. Birotto Is Debut film of director Saidul Islam Rana and actress Nishat Nawar Salwa.

Cast 

 Emon as Dr. Raju 
 Nishat Nawar Salwa as Dr. Dinat 
 Nipun as Luthfa  
 Muntaha Amelia as Puspa
 Intekhab Dinar as Musa Chowdhuri  
 Ahsan Habib Nasim as Masum 
 Jayanta Chattopadhyay as Dr. Moniruzzaman 
 Kachi Khandakar as MP 
 Mahmudul Islam Mithu as Mayor 
 Monira Mithu as Lawyer 
 Parvez Murad as Lawyer
 Shilpi Sarkar Apu as Dr. Raju’s Mother 
 Hanna Shelly as Dinat’s Father 
 Sabiha Zaman as Dinat’s Mother 
 Pirzada Shahidul Harun as George 
 Ranjan Dutta as Mr. Pasha 
 Shamim Visti as Police Officer Aman 
 Dicon Noor as Dubai Base Businessman 
 Tanvir Rizvi as Choton
 Jasmin Akter as Parul 
 Romana Swarna as Kusum 
 Rimu Roja Khandaker as Nurse 
 Rawnak Hasan as Police Officer
 Misty Zannat as Item Number

Music 

The film has a total of 3 songs. Music direcction was done by Golam Raabi Shohag. Artists of the songs were Imran Mahmudul, Puja, Parvez, Ankita Bhattacharyya.

Critical reception 
Zahid Akbar of The Daily Star wrote “an uptick in the position of Bengali films once again”.

The Daily Kaler kantho wrote "Emon reportedly portrayed a unique part, according to the spectators”.

See also 
 Cinema of Bangladesh

References

External links 
 Birotto at IMDb